The Turka is a river in the Republic of Buryatia, Russian Federation. The Turka is fast-flowing and is good for rafting.

Course 
It flows roughly westwards and southwestwards through rugged mountain terrain. Finally the river joins Lake Baikal in the lake's eastern shore by Turka village.

The main tributaries of the Turka are the Yambuy, Golonda, Ara-Khurtak, Uta, Urykta, Osinovka and Kotochik. The villages of Zolotoy Klyuch and Sobolikha are located by the Turka.

See also
List of rivers of Russia

References

External links

Turka River kayaking

Rivers of Buryatia